The 2019 Bella Cup was a professional tennis tournament played on outdoor clay courts. It was the twenty-fifth edition of the tournament which was part of the 2019 ITF Women's World Tennis Tour. It took place in Toruń, Poland between 3 and 9 June 2019.

Singles main-draw entrants

Seeds

 1 Rankings are as of 27 May 2019.

Other entrants
The following players received wildcards into the singles main draw:
  Weronika Falkowska
  Anna Hertel
  Paula Kania
  Stefania Rogozińska Dzik

The following players received entry from the qualifying draw:
  Carolina Alves
  Nicoleta Dascălu
  Jaimee Fourlis
  Verena Meliss
  Daniela Seguel
  Gabriela Talabă
  Nikola Tomanová
  Rosa Vicens Mas

Champions

Singles

 Rebecca Šramková def.  Marta Kostyuk, 6–1, 6–2

Doubles

 Rebeka Masarova /  Rebecca Šramková def.  Robin Anderson /  Anhelina Kalinina, 6–4, 3–6, [10–4]

References

External links
 2019 Bella Cup at ITFtennis.com
 Official website

2019 ITF Women's World Tennis Tour
2019 in Polish sport